Williamsport Area High School is a large, urban, public high school located in Williamsport, Lycoming County, Pennsylvania. The school is located at 2990 West 4th Street, Williamsport. In the 2017–18 school year, enrollment was reported as 1,489 pupils in 9th through 12th grades.

Extracurriculars
Williamsport Area High School offers a wide variety of clubs, activities and an extensive, publicly funded sports program.

Sports
The district funds:

Varsity

Boys
Baseball - AAAA
Basketball- AAAA
Cross country - AAA
Football - AAAAAA
Golf - AAA
Indoor track and field - AAAA
Soccer - AAA
Swimming and diving - AAA
Tennis - AAA
Track and field - AAA
Wrestling - AAA

Girls
Basketball - AAAA
Cheer - AAAA
Cross country - AAA
Golf - AAA
Indoor track and field - AAAA
Soccer - AAA
Softball - AAAA
Swimming and diving - AAA
Tennis - AAA
Track and field - AAA

According to PIAA directory July 2015

References

Schools in Lycoming County, Pennsylvania
Public high schools in Pennsylvania